Mario Zagari (14 September 1913–29 February 1996) was an Italian socialist politician, who served in the Italian Parliament and in the European parliament as well as in the Italian governments in various capacities.

Early life and education
Zagari was born in Milan on 14 September 1913. He held a law degree, which he received from the University of Milan. He attended courses of political economy at the University of Berlin.

During World War II, Zagari was an anti-Nazi resistance militant.

Career
After the war Zagari began his political activity. He was leader of the anti-Stalinist group, called Iniziativa Socialista. He became a member of the Socialist Party on 18 July 1952. In the late 1960s Zagari was part of the right-wing group in the party together with Pietro Nenni and Giovanni Pieraccini.

Zagari remained as a member of the Socialist Party until 24 July 1989. He served as the undersecretary at the ministry of foreign affairs for three times (specifically, from 23 February 1966 to 5 June 1968, from 22 July 1964 to 21 January 1966 and from 12 December 1968 to 5 July 1969).

In 1970 Zagari served as the minister of foreign trade in the cabinet of Mariano Rumor and led the first Italian commercial delegation to China in 1971. He was the justice minister from 7 July 1973 to 23 November 1974. Then he became one of twelve vice presidents of the European parliament on 27 October 1976 and held the post until 18 January 1982. He was part of the socialist group in the parliament. He ran for the presidency of the parliament in the elections held in July 1979, but lost the election.  In addition, he served at different commissions and delegations of the parliament from 14 March 1978 to 24 July 1989.

Controversy
After leaving office as justice minister Zagari was charged with abusing official acts, and making them public. The inquiry committee of the parliament, whose twenty members had been selected in proportion to the membership of the parties, rejected the case with a majority vote.

Death and legacy
Zagari died in Rome on 29 February 1996. He was buried in the Protestant Cemetery in Rome. On the tenth anniversary of his death a book by him and Giuseppe Muzzi was republished in 2006.

References

External links

1913 births
1996 deaths
Government ministers of Italy
Italian anti-fascists
Italian Ministers of Justice
Italian Socialist Party MEPs
Members of the Chamber of Deputies (Italy)
Members of the European Parliament for Italy
Politicians from Milan
University of Milan alumni